Crockett Springs Cottage, also known as Camp Alta Mons Cottage, is a historic home located at Piedmont, Montgomery County, Virginia.  It was built about 1889, and is a one-story, four-bay, two-room, frame cottage on brick piers. It features a porch with flat decorative wood posts and a square baluster railing. It is one of the few surviving structures from the large number of resorts within the county.  The Crockett Springs Hotel resort went out of business in 1939.

It was listed on the National Register of Historic Places in 1989.

References

Houses on the National Register of Historic Places in Virginia
Houses completed in 1889
Houses in Montgomery County, Virginia
National Register of Historic Places in Montgomery County, Virginia